KCAC (89.5 FM, "KC 89") is a non-commercial educational radio station broadcasting an alternative rock music format. Licensed to Camden, Arkansas, United States, the station is currently owned by Southern Arkansas University – Technical Branch.

History
The Federal Communications Commission issued a construction permit for the station to Camden Fairview School District, through its licensee Camden Career Center, on May 29, 1990. The station was assigned the KCAC call sign on June 14, 1990, and received its license to cover on April 1, 1993. The station's license was assigned by Camden Fairview School District to the current owner, Southern Arkansas University, on August 25, 2005, at a purchase price of $1.00.

References

External links
 Official Website
 

CAC
Radio stations established in 1993
Southern Arkansas University
Modern rock radio stations in the United States
1993 establishments in Arkansas
College radio stations in Arkansas
Camden, Arkansas